Eucalyptus delicata is a species of tree that is endemic to Western Australia. It has rough, fibrous to scaly bark on the trunk, smooth white to greyish bark above, linear to narrow lance-shaped adult leaves, flower buds in groups of between seven and eleven, creamy white flowers and more or less spherical to barrel-shaped fruit.

Description
It has rough fibrous to scaly grey bark on the lower half and a smooth grey-copper colour above. Young plants and coppice regrowth have linear to narrow lance-shaped, more or less sessile leaves arranged spirally along the stem. Flowering occurs in March or April and the flowers are creamy white.

Taxonomy and naming
Eucalyptus delicata was first formally described in 1999 by the botanists Lawrie Johnson and Ken Hill and the description was published in the journal Telopea.

This species is part of the Eucalyptus subgenus Symphyomyrtus in the section Bisectae and the subsection Destitutae. It is closely related to E. longicornis, E. oleosa and E. longissima. 

The specific epithet (delicata) is a Latin word meaning "tender", "dainty" or "fastidious", referring to the small buds and fruits.

Distribution
This eucalypt is found in flat areas of the Coolgardie and Mallee biogeographic regions of Western Australia where it grows in red clay to sandy-loamy soils.

Conservation status
Eucalyptus delicata is classified as "not threatened" by the Western Australian Government Department of Parks and Wildlife.

See also
List of Eucalyptus species

References

delicata
Endemic flora of Western Australia
Myrtales of Australia
Eucalypts of Western Australia
Trees of Australia
Plants described in 1999
Taxa named by Lawrence Alexander Sidney Johnson
Taxa named by Ken Hill (botanist)